Critical Reviews in Analytical Chemistry is a quarterly peer-reviewed scientific journal published by Taylor & Francis. It was established in 1970 as CRC Critical Reviews in Analytical Chemistry, obtaining its current name in 1989. The journal covers research in all areas of analytical chemistry. The editor-in-chief is Stephen E. Bialkowski (Utah State University).

Abstracting and indexing 
The journal is abstracted and indexed in Chemical Abstracts Service, Compendex, Current Contents/Physical, Chemical & Earth Sciences, Science Citation Index, Scopus, and MEDLINE. According to the Journal Citation Reports, the journal has a 2020 impact factor of 6.535.

References

External links 
 

Taylor & Francis academic journals
Publications established in 1970
English-language journals
Chemistry journals
Quarterly journals